Sukhāvatīvyūha Sūtra ("Sukhāvatī-vyūha") may refer to either of the following sūtras:

 The Larger (Longer) Sukhāvatīvyūha Sūtra, or the Infinite Life Sutra
 The Smaller (Shorter) Sukhāvatīvyūha Sūtra, or the Amitabha Sutra